Strange Words and Weird Wars is the second studio album by Scottish musician Marnie, released on 2 June 2017 through Disco Pinata. It is Marnie's second album released during the hiatus of her main band Ladytron, the first being Crystal World (2013).

Release

Strange Words and Weird Wars is the second solo album of the Scottish musician Marnie (full name Helen Marnie), the lead vocalist and one of the songwriters and keyboardists of the electronic band Ladytron. The album was released on 2 June 2017. The first single "Alphabet Block" premiered on 24 January 2017 on PopJustice. "Lost Maps" was chosen as the second single and it was released on 30 March.

Track listing

Personnel
Helen Marnie – vocals, synthesizers
Jonny Scott – production
Lewis Gardiner – mixing
John Davis at Metropolis – mastering
Peter Kelly – additional drums, "Boys/girls", "Mind owl" and "Electric" drawings
Aleksandra Modrzejewska – photography
Helen Marnie and Jonny Scott – additional in-studio photography

References

External links
 Ladytron official website

2017 albums
Helen Marnie albums
Avant-pop albums